Isaac "Ike" Morgan (June 28, 1871 – September 13, 1913) was a well-known newspaper illustrator for several big newspapers in Chicago and New York.

Biography 
Morgan was labeled "well-educated" by newspaper colleagues. He was fluent in Latin and an aficionado for the theater. He was born in Grand Tower, Illinois, and grew up in St. Louis, where he graduated from the St. Louis School of Fine Arts. Morgan was a good friend and colleague with L. Frank Baum and shared a studio with William Wallace Denslow, both joint creators of The Wizard of Oz. Morgan provided pictures for Baum's American Fairy Tales (1901), and illustrated The Woggle-Bug Book (1905). By one account, it was Morgan who introduced L. Frank Baum to Paul Tietjens, the composer for The Wizard of Oz and other stage projects. Both W.W. Denslow and Ike Morgan were influenced by Japanese woodcuts on French prints. Morgan developed his own pen-and-ink style and took pride with his color work in the Woggle-Bug Book, Boylan's Kids of Many Colors and in Steps to Nowhere.  His bold illustrations and colors used in various shapes and sizes emphasized his drawings in a dramatic way, rather than limiting their natural scope, so widely incorporated by other illustrators. Morgan was commissioned often for his paintings, theatrical posters and magazine covers.

Ike was married to Mrs. Pauline H. Swain Morgan. According to Denslow's biography it was Denslow who had hosted Morgan's wedding reception while his former roommate Paul Tietjans performed some of the music.

Ike Morgan died at his home in Brooklyn on September 13, 1913.

References

Sources 
 
 Billy Ireland Cartoon Museum
 American Fairy Tales, 1901, written by L. Frank Baum, illustrations Ike Morgan
 The St. Louis Republic, 1901

External links 
 
 More works by Morgan at philsp.com
 The Oz Enthusias

1871 births
1913 deaths
American illustrators
People from Jackson County, Florida